The Cat River is a river in the Unorganized Part of Kenora District in Northwestern Ontario, Canada. The river is part of the James Bay drainage basin, and flows from Cat Lake to Lake St. Joseph, the source of the Albany River, which flows to James Bay.

References

Sources

Rivers of Kenora District